The Socialist Destourian Party was the ruling political party of Tunisia from 1964 to 1988. Bahi Ladgham was the first Prime Minister from the party and Hédi Baccouche was the last. It was founded on 22 October 1964 and disbanded on 27 February 1988. Habib Bourgiba was the first president of the Socialist Destourian Party from 1964 to 1987. He was succeeded by Zine El Abidine Ben Ali from 1987 to 1988.

History

Independence of Tunisia from France was negotiated largely by the Neo Destour's Bourguiba. The effective date was March 20, 1956. The next year the Republic of Tunisia was constituted, which replaced the Beylical form of government. Tunisia became a one-party state, with Neo Destour as the ruling party under Prime Minister and later President Habib Bourguiba. Later the Neo Destour party was renamed the Socialist Destourian Party in 1964, to signal the government's commitment to a socialist phase of political-economic development. This phase failed to fulfill expectations, however, and was discontinued in 1969 with the dismissal of Ahmad ben Salah as economics minister by President Bourguiba.

The party was dissolved by President Ben Ali in 1988 and replaced by the Democratic Constitutional Rally.

Electoral history

Presidential elections

Chamber of Deputies elections

See also 
 Destour
 Neo Destour
 Democratic Constitutional Rally (RCD)

References

1964 establishments in Tunisia
1988 disestablishments in Tunisia
Political parties established in 1964
Political parties disestablished in 1988
Parties of one-party systems
Destourian parties
Defunct political parties in Tunisia